The 2008 Qatar motorcycle Grand Prix was the opening round of the 2008 MotoGP championship. It took place on the weekend of 7–9 March 2008 at the Losail International Circuit located in Doha, Qatar. The race was historic in that it was the first one to be run at night, with the MotoGP race getting underway at 23:00 local time. Rookies Lorenzo and Toseland started their season strong with Lorenzo getting pole position and Toseland in 2nd during qualifying.

MotoGP classification

250 cc classification

125 cc classification

Championship standings after the race (MotoGP)

Below are the standings for the top five riders and constructors after round one has concluded. 

Riders' Championship standings

Constructors' Championship standings

 Note: Only the top five positions are included for both sets of standings.

References

Qatar motorcycle Grand Prix
Qatar
Motorcycle Grand Prix